Partho Ganguli also spelt Ganguly is an Indian former badminton player. He was the national doubles champion four times and bronze medalist in mixed doubles once.He was awarded the Arjuna award in 1982.

Achievements

IBF International

References

Living people
Indian male badminton players
Indian national badminton champions
Asian Games medalists in badminton
Asian Games bronze medalists for India
Badminton players at the 1982 Asian Games
Badminton players at the 1974 Asian Games
Medalists at the 1974 Asian Games
Medalists at the 1982 Asian Games
Recipients of the Arjuna Award
Year of birth missing (living people)